The 2015 Eastern Kentucky Colonels football team represented Eastern Kentucky University during the 2015 NCAA Division I FCS football season. They were led by eighth-year head coach Dean Hood and played their home games at Roy Kidd Stadium. The Colonels were a member of the Ohio Valley Conference. They finished the season 6–5, 5–3 in OVC play to finish in fourth place.

Their game against Tennessee Tech originally scheduled for October 10 was played two days earlier at Toyota Stadium in Georgetown, Kentucky due to campus safety concerns in the wake of threatening graffiti in a campus restroom and other threats allegedly made over social media.

On November 23, Hood was fired. He finished at Eastern Kentucky with an eight-year record of 55–38.

Schedule

Source: Schedule

Ranking movements

References

Eastern Kentucky
Eastern Kentucky Colonels football seasons
Eastern Kentucky Colonels football